Susanne Fellner (born  in Ravensburg, West Germany) is a German ice hockey defender. Fellner also played for the University of North Dakota Women's Hockey team for the 2008-09 season.

International career

Fellner was selected for the Germany women's national ice hockey team in the 2006 and 2014 Winter Olympics. In 2006, she did not record a point in five games. In 2014, she again did not score in the five games.

Fellner also played for Germany in the qualifying event for the 2014 Winter Olympics, the 2010 Olympics and the 2006 Olympics.

As of 2014, Fellner has also appeared for Germany at six IIHF Women's World Championships. Her first appearance came in 2005.

Career statistics

International career
Through 2013-14 season

References

External links
Eurohockey.com Profile
Sports-Reference Profile
UND W Hockey Bio - Susanne Fellner

1985 births
People from Ravensburg
Sportspeople from Tübingen (region)
Living people
Olympic ice hockey players of Germany
Ice hockey players at the 2006 Winter Olympics
Ice hockey players at the 2014 Winter Olympics
German women's ice hockey defencemen